Little Russia, also known in English as Malorussia, Little Rus' and Rus' Minor (from ), is a geographical and historical term used to describe the modern-day territories of Ukraine. The first use of such names has been attributed to Yuri II Boleslav, the ruler of the Ruthenian Kingdom of Galicia–Volhynia. In 1335, he signed his decrees Dux totius Russiæ minoris. The distinction between "Great" and "Little" Rus' probably originated among Byzantine, Greek-speaking, clerics who wanted to separate the two Ruthenian ecclesiastical metropolises of Halych and Moscow.

The specific meaning of the adjectives "Great" and "Little" in this context is unclear. It is possible that terms such as "Little" and "Lesser" at the time simply meant geographically smaller and/or less populous, or having fewer eparchies. Another possibility is that it denoted a relationship similar to that between a homeland and a colony (just as "Magna Graecia" denoted a Greek colony). 

The name "Little Rus'/Russia" went out of use in the late 15th century. It was revived again in late 18th century. Then "Little Russia" developed into a political and geographical concept in Russia, referring to most of the territory of modern-day Ukraine, especially the territory of the Cossack Hetmanate. Accordingly, derivatives such as "Little Russian"  were commonly applied to the people, language, and culture of the area. A large part of the region's élite population adopted a Little Russian identity that competed with the local Ukrainian identity. The territories of modern-day southern Ukraine, after being annexed by Russia in the 18th century, became known as Novorossiya ("New Russia").

After the collapse of the Russian Empire in 1917, and with the amalgamation of Ukrainian territories into one administrative unit (the Ukrainian People's Republic and then the Ukrainian Soviet Socialist Republic), the term started to recede from common use. Today, the term is anachronistic, and many Ukrainians regard its usage as offensive.

Etymology and name variations

The toponym translates as Little or Lesser Rus’ and is adapted from the Greek term, used in medieval times by Patriarchs of Constantinople since the 14th century (it first appeared in church documents in 1335). Initially Little or Lesser meant the smaller part, as after the division of the united Rus' Metropolis (ecclesiastical province) into two parts in 1305, a new southwestern metropolis in the Kingdom of Halych-Volynia consisted of only 6 of the 19 former eparchies. It later lost its ecclesiastical associations and became a geographical name only.

In the 17th century, the term Malorossiya was introduced into Russian. In English the term is often translated Little Russia or Little Rus’, depending on context.

The Russian-Polish geographer and ethnographer Zygmunt Gloger in his "Geography of historic lands of the Old Poland" describes an alternative view of the term "Little" in relations to Little Russia where he compares it to the similar term of "Little Poland".

Historical usage

The first recorded usage of the term is attributed to Boleslaus George II of Halych. In a 1335 letter to Dietrich von Altenburg, the Grand Master of the Teutonic Knights, he styled himself «dux totius Rusiæ Minoris». The name was used by Patriarch Callistus I of Constantinople in 1361 when he created two metropolitan sees: Great Rus' in Vladimir and Kiev and Little Rus' with its centers in Galich (Halych) and Novgorodok (Navahrudak). King Casimir III of Poland was called "the king of Lechia and Little Rus'." According to Mykhaylo Hrushevsky, Little Rus' was the Halych-Volhynian Principality, after the downfall of which the name ceased to be used.

In the post-medieval period, the name Little Rus''' was first used by the Eastern Orthodox clergy of the Polish–Lithuanian Commonwealth, e.g. by influential cleric and writer Ioan Vyshensky (1600, 1608), Metropolitan Matthew of Kiev and All Rus' (1606), Bishop Ioann (Biretskoy) of Peremyshl, Metropolitan Isaiah (Kopinsky) of Kiev, Archimandrite Zacharias Kopystensky of Kiev Pechersk Lavra, etc. The term has been applied to all Orthodox Ruthenian lands of the Polish–Lithuanian Commonwealth. Vyshensky addressed "the Christians of Little Russia, brotherhoods of Lviv and Vilna," and Kopystensky wrote "Little Russia, or Kiev and Lithuania."

The term was adopted in the 17th century by the Tsardom of Russia to refer to the Cossack Hetmanate of Left-bank Ukraine, when the latter fell under Russian protection after the Treaty of Pereyaslav (1654). From 1654 to 1721, the official title of Russian tsars contained the language (literal translation) "The Sovereign of all Rus': the Great, the Little, and the White."The term Little Rus' has been used in letters of the Cossack Hetmans Bohdan Khmelnytsky and Ivan Sirko."Листи Івана Сірка", изд. Института украинской археографии, К. 1995, с. 13 и 16. Innokentiy Gizel, Archimandrite of the Kiev-Pechersk Lavra, wrote that the Russian people were a union of three branches—Great Russia, Little Russia, and White Russia—under the sole legal authority of the Moscow Tsars. The term Little Russia has been used in Ukrainian chronicles by Samiilo Velychko, in a chronicle of the Hieromonk Leontiy (Bobolinski), and in Thesaurus by Archimandrite Ioannikiy (Golyatovsky).Русина О. В. Україна під татарами і Литвою. – Київ: Видавничий дім «Альтернативи», 1998. – с. 279.

The usage of the name was later broadened to apply loosely to the parts of Right-bank Ukraine when it was annexed by Russia at the end of the 18th century upon the partitions of Poland. In the 18th and 19th centuries, the Russian Imperial administrative units known as the Little Russian Governorate and eponymous General Governorship were formed and existed for several decades before being split and renamed in subsequent administrative reforms.

Up to the very end of the 19th century, Little Russia was the prevailing term for much of the modern territory of Ukraine controlled by the Russian Empire, as well as for its people and their language. This can be seen from its usage in numerous scholarly, literary and artistic works. Ukrainophile historians Mykhaylo Maksymovych, Mykola Kostomarov, Dmytro Bahaliy, and Volodymyr Antonovych acknowledged the fact that during the Russo-Polish wars, Ukraine had only a geographical meaning, referring to the borderlands of both states, but Little Russia was the ethnonym of Little (Southern) Russian people. In his prominent work Two Russian nationalities, Kostomarov uses Southern Russia and Little Russia interchangeably. Mykhailo Drahomanov titled his first fundamental historic work Little Russia in Its literature (1867–1870). Different prominent artists (e.g., Mykola Pymonenko, Kostyantyn Trutovsky, Nikolay Aleksandrovich Sergeyev, photographer Sergey Prokudin-Gorsky, etc.), many of whom were native to the territory of modern-day Ukraine, used Little Russia in the titles of their paintings of Ukrainian landscapes.

The term Little Russian language was used by the state authorities in the first Russian Empire Census, conducted in 1897.

From Little Russia to Ukraine

The term Little Russia, which traces its origin to medieval times, was once widely used as the name for the geographic territory. The first appearance of the name Ukraine (Ukraina) was in 12th-century chronicles; it was used sporadically from the mid-17th century until it was reintroduced in the 19th century by several writers making a conscious effort to awaken Ukrainian national awareness. But it was not until the 20th century when the modern term Ukraine started to prevail, while Little Russia gradually fell out of use.

Modern context
The term Little Russia (Rus' Minor) is now anachronistic when used to refer to the country Ukraine and the modern Ukrainian nation, its language, culture, etc. Such usage is typically perceived as conveying an imperialist view that the Ukrainian territory and people ("Little Russians") belong to "one, indivisible Russia." Today, many Ukrainians consider the term disparaging, indicative of imperial Russian (and Soviet) suppression of Ukrainian identity and language. It has continued to be used in Russian nationalist discourse, in which modern Ukrainians are presented as a single people in a united Russian nation. This has provoked new hostility toward and disapproval of the term by some Ukrainians. In July 2021 Vladimir Putin published a 7000-word essay, a large part of which was devoted to expounding these views.

"Little Russianness"

The concept of "Little Russianness" is defined by some Ukrainian authors as a provincial complex they see in parts of the Ukrainian community due to its lengthy existence within the Russian Empire. They describe it as an "indifferent, and sometimes a negative stance towards Ukrainian national-statehood traditions and aspirations, and often as active support of Russian culture and of Russian imperial policies". Mykhailo Drahomanov, who used the terms Little Russia and Little Russian in his historical works, applied the term Little Russianness to Russified Ukrainians, whose national character was formed under "alien pressure and influence" and who consequently adopted the "worse qualities of other nationalities and lost the better ones of their own". Ukrainian conservative ideologue and politician Vyacheslav Lypynsky defined the term as "the malaise of statelessness". The same inferiority complex has been said to apply to the Ukrainians of Galicia with respect to Poland (gente ruthenus, natione polonus). The related term Madiarony'' has been used to describe Magyarized Rusyns in Carpathian Ruthenia who advocated for the union of that region with Hungary.

The term "Little Russians" has also been used to denote stereotypically uneducated, rustic Ukrainians exhibiting little or no self-esteem. The uncouth stage persona of popular Ukrainian singer and performer Andriy Mykhailovych Danylko is an embodiment of this stereotype; his Surzhyk-speaking drag persona Verka Serduchka has also been seen as perpetuating this demeaning image. Danylko himself usually laughs off such criticism of his work, and many art critics argue that his success with the Ukrainian public is rooted in the unquestionable authenticity of his presentation.

In popular culture 
Tchaikovsky's Symphony No 2 in C minor, Op 17, is nicknamed the "Little Russian" from its use of Ukrainian folk tunes. In April 2022, it was proposed that the sub-title "Little Russian" should be replaced with "Ukrainian" to clarify the musical inspiration for this work.

Notes

See also 
 Great Russia
 Lesser Poland
 New Russia
 Red Ruthenia
 Symphony No. 2 (Tchaikovsky)

References

Further reading
 Bibliography of Russian history
 Bibliography of Ukrainian history
 List of Slavic studies journals

Early Modern history of Russia
Early Modern history of Ukraine
18th-century establishments in Ukraine
Historical regions in Russia
Historical regions in Ukraine
Russia
Russian nationalism
Russification
History of Ruthenia